South of Death Valley is a 1949 American Western film directed by Ray Nazarro and written by Earle Snell. The film stars Charles Starrett, Gail Davis, Fred F. Sears, Lee Roberts, Richard Emory, Clayton Moore, Smiley Burnette and Tommy Duncan. The film was released on August 8, 1949, by Columbia Pictures.

Plot

Cast          
Charles Starrett as Steve Downey / The Durango Kid
Gail Davis as Molly Tavish
Fred F. Sears as Sam Ashton 
Lee Roberts as Scotty Tavish
Richard Emory as Tommy Tavish
Clayton Moore as Brad
Smiley Burnette as Smiley Burnette
Tommy Duncan as Tommy

References

External links
 

1949 films
1940s English-language films
American Western (genre) films
1949 Western (genre) films
Columbia Pictures films
Films directed by Ray Nazarro
American black-and-white films
1940s American films